San Francisco CalHeat is a handball club from the San Francisco Bay Area. It has approximately 100 members (adult and youth), and five teams (women, men and youth). The top women's and men's teams compete at the highest level in the United States and have won the national championships multiple times. The men's team is the current USA Team Handball reigning national champion.

On the last weekend of January, San Francisco CalHeat traditionally hosts the California Cup tournament. This is a USA Team Handball sanctioned event and qualifier for the USA Team Handball Nationals.

The main sponsors of the club are Waymo, RockTape and the DishDash Restaurant Group. In January 2020, San Francisco CalHeat signed a multi-year partnership with Hummel, the Danish manufacturing company of sportswear brand based in Aarhus.

History 
The club was founded in 1984 following the continuously growing interest of handball in the San Francisco Bay Area. Back in 1979, Ray Gehrke, considered one of the founding fathers of the sport in California, began an intramural handball program at the Centerville Jr. High School. San Francisco CalHeat was subsequently created in an effort to centralize handball activities in one area.

In 2011, San Francisco CalHeat became a non-profit organization exempt from Federal income tax under section 501 {c} (3) of the Internal Revenue Code. Under the leadership of Bernward Schwarte, President, and Jean-Marc Junique, Vice-President, the club has significantly grown ever since.

In 2016, San Francisco CalHeat started a youth development program and handball league involving numerous schools in the San Francisco Bay Area such as Lycée Français de San Francisco and Leland High School (San Jose, California). In 2019, the program culminated with the organization of summer and winter camps led by Claus Dalgaard-Hansen, former member of the Denmark men's national handball team, and David Degouy, assistant coach and handball academy director of Montpellier Handball.

In 2019, the club got even more exposure abroad after Nicolas Raemy, player of Wacker Thun and longstanding member of the Switzerland national handball team, helped the team win the US men's national championship

In 2021, the club won the North American and Caribbean Men's Club Championship and qualified for the IHF Super Globe. For their inaugural participation, the team finished at the 10th place losing against AlWehda, the Saudi Arabian champion, Al Noor Handball Club, and Al Duhail, the 2020 Asian Men's Club League Handball Championship.

In 2022, the club won another US Men's National Championship in Adrian, Michigan. This is the sixth national title for the men's team, bringing them closer to the all-time greats New York Athletic Club and New York City THC.

Sports Facility Information
Name: – Ray Gehrke Court
City: – Fremont, California
Capacity: – 1,000
Address: – Centerville Jr. High School, 37720 Fremont Blvd, Fremont, CA 94536

Accomplishments

International 
 :2022 North American and Caribbean Senior Club Championship
10th :2021 IHF Men's Super Globe
 :2021 North American and Caribbean Senior Club Championship
Qualified :2020 North American and the Caribbean Senior Club Championship

National 
 USA Team Handball Nationals
 Men's Elite Division
  : 1984, 1985, 1986, 1990, 2019, 2022
  : 1987, 2018
  : 1996, 2001, 2002
 Women's Open Division
  : 2003, 2006
  : 1997, 1998, 2004, 2005
  : 1995, 1996
 Men's Open Division
  : 2022
 Men's Youth Division
  : 2022
Due to the COVID-19 pandemic in the United States, the 2020 and 2021 USA Team Handball Nationals were cancelled.

Teams

Men's first team
Squad for the 2022–23 season

Goalkeepers
1  Lucas Kröger
 32  Omar Bentahar
 99  Hamadi Balti
Left Wingers
 25  Drew Bradley
 38  Theodor Skogsholm
Right Wingers
 36  Paul Assfalg
 51  Yannik te Morsche
Line players
 15  Andrew Donlin
 19  Sören Müller
 52  Jonathan Garcia

Left Backs
 14  Maximilian Paulus
 54  Hjalte Nordquist Clausen
 63  Ole Andreas Olsen
Central Backs
6  Tsai Hsien (Joseph) Kuo
 11  Mikio Tada
 17  Florian Schöbinger
 53  Kasper Ogendahl
 61  Eloy Rubio Blanco (c)
Right Backs
 55  Luca Engler
 62  Zuwed Akuro
Coach
  Danilo Rojevic

Women's first team
Squad for the 2022–23 season

Goalkeepers
1  Athena Del Rosario
 66  Janine McDonald
Left Wingers
 33  Claire Boussuge
 43  Kerstin Kraemer
 75  Leila Movahedian
Right Wingers
6  Padideh Deris
 12  Marine Dunoguier
 45  Constance Duvert
Line players
8  Maria Florencia D'Innocenzo (c)
 40  Alyssa Hoffert

Left Backs
 15  Michelle Mensing
 31  Hannah Baaske
 41  Simona Cipaian
Central Backs
5  Ines Resano Goizueta
 32  Marina Fidalgo
Right Backs
3  Agustina Amiconi
 23  Liubovi Gurgurova
 52  Ethel Vallejos
Coach
  Kristina Alavanja

References

External links 
 

Handball clubs established in 1984
1984 establishments in California
American handball clubs